The enzyme super-family of molybdenum oxotransferases all contain molybdenum, and promote oxygen atom transfer reactions.

Enzymes in this family include DMSO reductase, xanthine oxidase, nitrite reductase, and sulfite oxidase.

See also 
 Bioinorganic chemistry

References 

Metalloproteins
Molybdenum compounds